Little Peeter's Dream is a 1958 Estonian animated film directed by Elbert Tuganov and based on the children's book by . The film was the first Estonian animated film after WW II. In 2009 the film was digitally restored.

The film talks about little Peeter who wakes up on the morning and he finds that he is absolutely alone in the world. He begins to play and frolic. Finally he discovers that it was just a dream.

References

External links
 
 Little Peeter's Dream, entry in Estonian Film Database (EFIS)

1958 films
Estonian animated films